"Domino Effect" is a song by the British girlpop-duo Addictive. It was released on 4 October 2009 on 2NV Records. The song is produced by Danish R&B-singer Burhan G and mixed by Simon Gogerly.

Track listing

References

2009 singles
Dance-pop songs
Songs written by Terri Bjerre
2009 songs